Naeem ul Haque (11 July 1949 – 15 February 2020) was a Pakistani politician who was the Special Assistant to the Prime Minister of Pakistan Imran Khan on Political Affairs. He was also co-founder of the Pakistan Tehreek-e-Insaf (PTI) and served as its Central Information Secretary and President of PTI Sindh.He died on 15 February 2020 after battling the disease for 2 years.

Death 
Naeemul Haque was suffering from blood cancer for a long time. During his chemotherapy, he limited his political activities but remained active on Twitter. During the last days of his life, he was admitted to Aga Khan University Hospital (AKUH).

On 15 February 2020, Haque was rushed to Aga Khan University Hospital. He was kept in the intensive care unit (ICU) where he died at the age of 70. He received condolences from across the political spectrum.

Prime Minister Imran Khan in his Tweet said he was "devastated" on the death of his "oldest friend". 

In his Tweet, Federal Minister for Science and Technology Chaudhry paid tribute to the late PTI leader despite their differences in the past. He said "Naeemul Haque fought like a lion against cancer" and termed the deceased politician "a friend, elder and a colleague".

References

Imran Khan administration
1949 births
2020 deaths
People from Karachi
Deaths from cancer in Pakistan